Arbudas is a genus of moths in the family Zygaenidae.

Species
Arbudas bicolor Moore, 1879 – from Vietnam, India.
Arbudas funerea Jordan, 1907 – from China (Hainan)
Arbudas leno C. Swinhoe, 1900 – from Taiwan and India
Arbudas melanoleuca Tarmann, 1992 – from Vietnam
Arbudas rubricollum Alberti, 1954 – from China
Arbudas submacula Wileman, 1910 – from Taiwan
Arbudas tobaensis Tarmann, 1992 – from Sumatra

References

External links
 - with an image

Chalcosiinae
Zygaenidae genera